Mohamed Naceur Chouchane (born 3 May 1955) is a Tunisian former footballer. He competed in the men's tournament at the 1988 Summer Olympics.

References

External links
 
 

1955 births
Living people
Tunisian footballers
Tunisia international footballers
Espérance Sportive de Tunis players
Olympic footballers of Tunisia
Footballers at the 1988 Summer Olympics
Place of birth missing (living people)
Association football goalkeepers